Agrarian Politics Union Party (in Spanish: Partido Unión Política Agropecuaria) was a political party in Alajuela province, Costa Rica. PUPA was founded on June 26, 1985.

PUPA was later disbanded. The Agrarian Labour Action Party (PALA) was founded as a continuation of the movement in 1987.

References 

1985 establishments in Costa Rica
Agrarian parties in Costa Rica
Defunct political parties in Costa Rica
Political parties established in 1985
Political parties with year of disestablishment missing